Brandon James Cooper (born 14 January 2000) is a Welsh professional footballer who plays as a centre back for Forest Green Rovers on loan from EFL Championship club Swansea City. He is a Wales Under-21 international.

Career

Swansea City
Cooper has been at Swansea since the age of 6. He played for the Swansea under-18s and under-23s then signed a professional contract extension in March 2018.

He was handed his debut for Swansea on 28 August 2018 in a 1–0 defeat to Crystal Palace in the EFL Cup.

On 7 February 2020, Cooper joined National League side Yeovil Town on loan until the end of the 2019–20 season.

On 7 September 2020, Cooper joined League Two side Newport County on a season-long loan. He made his debut for Newport on 8 September 2020 in the starting line up for the 1-0 EFL Trophy defeat to Cheltenham Town. He made his football league debut on 12 September 2020 as a half time substitute for Matt Dolan in the 1–1 draw for Newport County against Scunthorpe United on the first day of the 2020-21 League Two season. Cooper scored his first football league for Newport in the 2-1 League Two win against Harrogate Town on 31 October 2020. Cooper was selected as the October 2020 EFL Young Player of the Month. On 5 January 2021 Cooper's loan at Newport ended when he was recalled by Swansea. On 29 January 2022, Cooper joined EFL League Two side Swindon Town on loan for the remainder of the 2021–22 season. Cooper made his Swindon debut in the starting line-up for the League Two 1-1 draw against Crawley Town on 2 February 2022.

On 2 January 2023, Cooper signed for League One club Forest Green Rovers on loan until the end of the 2022–23 season.

International
Cooper received his first call-up to the Wales senior squad in March 2021 for the friendly match against Mexico and the World Cup qualifier against Czech Republic.

Career statistics

References

2000 births
Living people
Footballers from Bridgend
Wales youth international footballers
Wales under-21 international footballers
Association football defenders
Swansea City A.F.C. players
Yeovil Town F.C. players
Newport County A.F.C. players
Swindon Town F.C. players
Forest Green Rovers F.C. players
National League (English football) players
English Football League players
Welsh footballers